Amnon Freidberg (18 September 1945 – 10 October 2020) was an Israeli entomologist. In his career he described 257 new insect taxa, predominantly flies.

Biography
Freidberg was born in 1945 in Haifa. He studied biology in Tel Aviv University and worked with Professor Jehoshua Kugler in taxonomic and faunistic research. In 1971 he completed his MSc thesis on fruit flies of Israel (Tephritidae) and in 1978 his PhD dissertation on the reproductive behavior and reproductive isolation in fruit‑flies.

Freidberg was chief editor of the Israel Journal of Entomology for nearly two decades (1982–1986, 1990–1998, 2005–2012).

He was curator of the entomological collection of Tel Aviv University until his retirement in 2013.

On October 10, 2020, Freidberg died from COVID-19 during the COVID-19 pandemic in Israel.

Taxa named in his honor

References

1945 births
2020 deaths
Israeli entomologists
Tel Aviv University alumni
Deaths from the COVID-19 pandemic in Israel
Scientists from Haifa